The Men's Beach volleyball Tournament at the 2002 Asian Games was held from September 29 to October 4, 2002 in Busan, South Korea.

Schedule
All times are Korea Standard Time (UTC+09:00)

Results

Preliminary round

Pool A

Pool B

Pool C

Pool D

Knockout round

Final standing

References

2002 Asian Games Report, Pages 746

External links
Official website

Beach Men